Clifton is a city in Passaic County, in the U.S. state of New Jersey. Criss-crossed by several major highways, the city is a regional commercial hub for North Jersey and is a bedroom suburb of New York City in the New York Metropolitan Area. As of the 2020 United States census, the city retained its position as the state's 11th-most-populous municipality, with a population of 90,296, an increase of 6,160 (+7.3%) from the 2010 census count of 84,136, which in turn reflected increased by 5,464 (+6.9%) from the 78,672 counted in the 2000 census. The Census Bureau's Population Estimates Program calculated that the city's population was 89,367 in 2021, ranking the city the 383rd-most-populous in the country.

Clifton was incorporated as a city by an act of the New Jersey Legislature on April 26, 1917, replacing Acquackanonk Township, based on the results of a referendum held two days earlier. Clifton is listed under five different ZIP codes. 07011, 07012, 07013, 07014, and 07015.

History
The city of Clifton turned 100 years-old in 2017, but documented European settlement in the area date back to 1679 when a leader of the Lenape Native Americans gave a deed for  along the shores of the Passaic River to Hans Frederick. The modern name of "Clifton" was derived from the cliffs of Garrett Mountain which borders the Albion Place neighborhood in the western part of the city. Clifton was an agricultural hub and home to the U.S. Animal Quarantine Station was operated in Clifton by the United States Department of Agriculture starting in 1903. It was served by the Newark Branch of the Erie-Lackawanna Railroad. It was the primary location on the East Coast where animals from poultry, horses and cattle to zoo animals were held in quarantine after being brought into the United States to ensure that the animals were not infected with diseases that could be spread in the U.S. The station operated in Clifton until the late 1970s, when the facility was relocated to Stewart International Airport.

Although Clifton and surrounding towns have long converted from farmlands to suburban communities, given their close proximity to Manhattan (Clifton is less than 15 miles directly west from Midtown), the town still boasts two small working farms that sell fresh organic vegetables in-season:

 Ploch's Farm: A family-run 15-acre farm since 1867.
 City Green Farm Eco Center: An organic farm and 501(c)3 non-profit focused on promoting urban farming and education since 2004.

Geography
According to the United States Census Bureau, the city had a total area of 11.43 square miles (29.60 km2), including 11.27 square miles (29.19 km2) of land and 0.16 square miles (0.41 km2) of water (1.37%).

The Passaic River provides part of the boundary of Clifton at its North-East edge. Weasel Brook is a tributary of the Passaic which links from Plog Brook, passing through Weasel Brook Park before turning South and joining the Passaic River close to Route 21.

Unincorporated communities, localities, and place names, located partially or completely within the city, include:
 Albion Place - mostly residential, adjacent to Garret Mountain Reservation;
 Allwood - the other main "business district" in the city, along its main highway, State Route 3;
 Athenia - one of the more centrally located neighborhoods in the city;
 Botany Village - the northernmost neighborhood in the city, historically containing European ethnic groups, but mostly populated by Hispanic/Latino immigrants in recent years;
 Delawanna - home to one of the two train stations locally, and adjacent to Nutley/the 3rd Ward Park neighborhood in Passaic;
 Dutch Hill - mostly residential, and largely situated just below downtown;
 Lakeview - shares its name with the adjacent neighborhood in Paterson, and mostly populated by Arab and Hispanic/Latino residents;
 Main Mall - considered the main "downtown" section of the city;
 Montclair Heights - one of the wealthiest neighborhoods locally, adjacent to both Montclair State University, as well as Upper Montclair;
 Richfield - another of the more centrally located neighborhoods in the city, along with Athenia;
 Rosemawr - largely residential and wealthier, falling partially within Allwood;
 Styertowne - home to the main namesake shopping plaza in the city;
 Yanticaw Pond - adjacent to the neighboring municipalities of Bloomfield and Nutley

The city is also served by the Garden State Parkway, Route 19 and Route 21.

The city borders the municipalities of Little Falls, Passaic, Paterson and Woodland Park in Passaic County; Elmwood Park, Garfield, Lyndhurst and Rutherford in Bergen County; and Bloomfield, Montclair and Nutley in Essex County.

Demographics

2010 census

The Census Bureau's 2006–2010 American Community Survey showed that (in 2010 inflation-adjusted dollars) median household income was $62,271 (with a margin of error of +/− $3,208) and the median family income was $76,070 (+/− $2,883). Males had a median income of $49,780 (+/− $2,391) versus $40,149 (+/− $2,057) for females. The per capita income for the city was $29,812 (+/− $1,255). About 7.2% of families and 9.3% of the population were below the poverty line, including 15.5% of those under age 18 and 9.3% of those age 65 or over.

Same-sex couples headed 243 households in 2010.

2000 census
As of the 2000 United States census there were 78,672 people, 30,244 households, and 20,354 families residing in the city. The population density was 6,965.2 people per square mile (2,688.1/km2). There were 31,060 housing units at an average density of 2,749.9 per square mile (1,061.3/km2). The racial makeup of the city was 66.22% White, 2.89% African American, 0.24% Native American, 6.44% Asian, 0.03% Pacific Islander, 9.60% from other races, and 4.57% from two or more races. Hispanic or Latino people of any race were 19.84% of the population.

There were 30,244 households, out of which 28.9% had children under the age of 18 living with them, 51.3% were married couples living together, 11.5% had a female householder with no husband present, and 32.7% were non-families. 27.9% of all households were made up of individuals, and 13.7% had someone living alone who was 65 years of age or older. The average household size was 2.59 and the average family size was 3.20.

In the city the population was 21.6% under the age of 18, 7.7% from 18 to 24, 30.7% from 25 to 44, 22.5% from 45 to 64, and 17.6% who were 65 years of age or older. The median age was 39 years. For every 100 females, there were 91.4 males. For every 100 females age 18 and over, there were 88.1 males.

The median income for a household in the city was $50,619, and the median income for a family was $60,688. Males had a median income of $40,143 versus $32,090 for females. The per capita income for the city was $23,638. About 4.3% of families and 6.3% of the population were below the poverty line, including 8.6% of those under age 18 and 5.2% of those age 65 or over.

The most common ancestry groups in Clifton as of 2000 were Italian American (17%), Polish American (13%), Irish American (9%) and German American (8%). Many Turkish, Albanian, and Ukrainian immigrants also live in Clifton. There are significant populations of Puerto Ricans, Dominicans, Arabs, Filipinos, Chinese, and Indians as well.

Economy

Clifton is a diverse suburb of New York City, just over 10 miles to the West of the city. It boasts numerous national and local shopping options like Trader Joe's, Costco, Home Depot, Target, Stew Leonard's Wine Shop and countless specialty grocers and retailers. Notable local businesses in Clifton include:
 The world headquarters of Comodo, a leading cybersecurity company, is in Clifton.
 Rutt's Hut, a hot dog restaurant, is located at the east end of Delawana Avenue. Established in 1928, it was described by Peter Applebome of The New York Times as being "on the long shortlist of the state's esteemed hot dog palaces".
 Promenade Shops at Clifton is an upscale mall located on Route 3 West.
 Many low-rise office buildings, containing professional tenants such as law and accounting firms and medical practices, are found on the stretch of Clifton Avenue between City Hall (at Van Houten) and Allwood Road.
 The now defunct Linens 'n Things, a bedding and home furnishings retailer, was headquartered in Clifton before its 2009 bankruptcy.

Government

Local government
The city of Clifton is governed under the 1923 Municipal Manager Law. The city is one of seven municipalities (of the 564) statewide governed under this form. The governing body is the City Council, which is comprised of seven council members, with all positions elected at-large on a non-partisan basis to concurrent four-terms of office as part of the November general election. The Mayor is chosen by the City Council, with the position traditionally given to the top vote getter in the previous election. Clifton's municipal elections had been held in May, as required for municipalities conducting non-partisan elections. Following the passage of a state law in 2010 allowing non-partisan elections to be shifted to November, Clifton voters were overwhelmingly in favor of the move in a non-binding referendum held in November 2013. On December 13, 2013, the Clifton City Council voted 6–0, with one abstention, to make the move to November elections binding, which had the effect of extending the terms of all sitting council members by six months, from June 30 to December 31. Officials cited increased voter participation and reduced costs as the justifications behind supporting the shift.

As of 2023, Clifton's Mayor is Raymond Grabowski, whose term of office ends December 31, 2026. He replaced James Anzaldi, who had been one of the members of the City Council since 1978, and was first selected to be mayor in 1990, succeeding two-term Mayor Gloria Kolodziej. Anzaldi was the first Mayor in Clifton's history to be elected to six terms. The other members of the City Council are William "Bill" Gibson, Antonio Latona, Joseph Kolodziej, Lauren E. Murphy, Rosemary Pino, and Mary Sadrakula, all of whom are serving concurrent terms of office that end on December 31, 2026.

Grabowski's election and Council nomination as Mayor ended up being considered the most contentious local political event since 1966, when the then-top vote getter, Bill Bate, the only Democrat on the Council at that time, ended up getting passed over in favor of Joseph Vanecek, as, this time around, Grabowski would only get 4 of the 7 possible votes on the Council, as opposed to Anzaldi, who won most, if not all, of those votes unanimously in each of his terms, with the other 3 votes going to newcomer Antonio Latona (Grabowski/Kolodziej/Murphy/Sadrakula voting for Grabowski; Gibson/Latona/Pino, surprisingly, voting for Latona, all despite Gibson reportedly privately considering taking enough of those votes away from Grabowski to become Mayor himself as of January 2023, even though Grabowski won at the polls in November 2022 by the final margin of roughly 9,400-8,200).

Vacancies
If at any time a seat becomes vacant on the council, it is filled by special election unless the vacancy occurs during a council election year. In the interim, the council is allowed to appoint an interim councilperson to fill the seat until the election can take place (again, except when the entire council is up for election); common practice is to nominate the eighth-place candidate from the previous election.

The city has done this four times since 1990:

In 1992, Councilman George Bayeux died in office. That fall, Richard Stockinger was elected to take his place.
Stockinger became the next council member to die in office, succumbing to lung cancer in March 1996. The special election to fill his seat was won by Ed Welsh.
In 2006, after the new council was elected, Antonio Latona was disqualified from taking his newly elected office as it was determined he was involved in a conflict of interest due to his employment by the city fire department. City policy dictates that the next highest vote getter in the election be appointed to a vacancy, and thus the seat was filled by Matthew Ward as the candidate with the eighth highest total. The special election to fill the vacancy was held in November 2007, with Ward retaining his seat.
In February 2015, just after he was sworn into office for a second term, Councilman Matt Grabowski died from cancer. The council appointed Joseph Cupoli, the highest vote-getter among the losing candidates, to fill the seat until the November election. Raymond Grabowski, the councilman's brother, won the special election to serve out the remainder of the term.

Federal, state and county representation
Clifton is located in the 9th Congressional District and is part of New Jersey's 34th state legislative district.

 

Passaic County is governed by Board of County Commissioners, comprised of seven members who are elected at-large to staggered three-year terms office on a partisan basis, with two or three seats coming up for election each year as part of the November general election in a three-year cycle. At a reorganization meeting held in January, the board selects a Director and Deputy Director from among its members to serve for a one-year term. 
As of 2023, Passaic County's Commissioners are 
Director Bruce James (D, Clifton, 2023),
Deputy Director Cassandra "Sandi" Lazzara (D, Little Falls, 2024),
John W. Bartlett (D, Wayne, term as commissioner ends 2024; term as deputy director ends 2023),
Theodore O. "T.J." Best Jr. (D, Paterson, 2023),
Terry Duffy (D, West Milford, 2025),
Nicolino Gallo (R, Totowa, 2024) and 
Pasquale "Pat" Lepore (D, Woodland Park, term as commissioner ends 2025; term as director ends 2023).
Constitutional officers, elected on a countywide basis, are:
County Clerk Danielle Ireland-Imhof (D, Hawthorne, 2023),
Sheriff Richard H. Berdnik (D, Clifton, 2025) and 
Surrogate Zoila S. Cassanova (D, Wayne, 2026).

Politics
As of January 2021, there were a total of 53,555 registered voters in Clifton, of which 22,940 (42.8% vs. 31.0% countywide) were registered as Democrats, 9,562 (18% vs. 18.7%) were registered as Republicans, and 20,150 (37.5% vs. 50.3%) were registered as Unaffiliated. There were 19 voters registered to other parties. Among the city's 2020 Census population, 52.9% (vs. 53.2% in Passaic County) were registered to vote, including 67.9% of those ages 18 and over (vs. 70.8% countywide).

In the 2020 presidential election, Democrat Joe Biden received 59% of the vote (23,930 cast), ahead of the then-President, Republican Donald Trump, with 39.7% of the vote (16,128 cast), and all other candidates with 1.3% of the vote (565 cast), among the 40,623 ballots cast by the city's 57,785 registered voters (70.3%); almost all ballots statewide in the 2020 presidential election were cast via vote-by-mail, however, due to the ongoing pandemic. In the 2016 presidential election, Democrat Hillary Clinton received 60% of the vote (20,425 votes cast), ahead of Republican Donald Trump with 37% (12,620 votes cast), and all other candidates with their combined 3% (973 votes). In the 2012 presidential election, the then-President, Democrat Barack Obama, received 62.6% of the vote (18,761 cast), ahead of Republican Mitt Romney with 36.3% (10,885 votes), and other candidates with 1.0% (305 votes), among the 30,261 ballots cast by the city's 47,933 registered voters (310 ballots were spoiled), for turnout of 63.1%. In the 2008 presidential election, Democrat Barack Obama received 18,260 votes (56.5% vs. 58.8% countywide), ahead of Republican John McCain with 12,848 votes (39.8% vs. 37.7%) and other candidates with 334 votes (1.0% vs. 0.8%), among the 32,317 ballots cast by the city's 44,903 registered voters, for turnout of 72.0% (vs. 70.4% in Passaic County). In the 2004 presidential election, Democrat John Kerry received 15,597 votes (52.0% vs. 53.9% countywide), ahead of the then-President, Republican George W. Bush, with 13,120 votes (43.8% vs. 42.7%), and other candidates with 228 votes (0.8% vs. 0.7%), among the 29,971 ballots cast by the city's 41,220 registered voters, for turnout of 72.7% (vs. 69.3% in the whole county).

In the 2021 gubernatorial election, the-then Governor, Democrat Phil Murphy, received 10,240 votes cast (54%), ahead of Republican Jack Ciattarelli with 8,485 votes cast (45%), and all other candidates with 200 combined votes (1%), among the 18,918 ballots cast by the city's 53,555 registered voters (35.3%); despite Murphy winning by noticeably closer margins both locally and statewide compared to 2017, there were many more in-person votes cast once again, in contrast with 2020. In the 2017 gubernatorial election, Democrat Phil Murphy received 9,465 votes cast (61.3%), ahead of Republican Kim Guadagno with 5,655 votes cast (36.7%), and all other candidates with 315 combined votes (2%), among the 15,435 ballots cast by the city's 52,065 registered voters (30%). In the 2013 gubernatorial election, Republican Chris Christie received 56.0% of the vote (9,304 cast), ahead of Democrat Barbara Buono with 42.8% (7,106 votes), and other candidates with 1.2% (199 votes), among the 16,970 ballots cast by the city's 49,231 registered voters (361 ballots were spoiled), for turnout of 34.5%. In the 2009 gubernatorial election, Democrat Jon Corzine received 9,080 ballots cast (49.1% vs. 50.8% countywide), ahead of Republican Chris Christie with 8,221 votes (44.5% vs. 43.2%), Independent Chris Daggett with 786 votes (4.3% vs. 3.8%) and other candidates with 243 votes (1.3% vs. 0.9%), among the 18,483 ballots cast by the city's 43,808 registered voters, yielding 42.2% turnout (vs. 42.7% in the county). In the 2005 gubernatorial election, Democrat Jon Corzine received 9,925 votes cast (56.5%), ahead of Republican Doug Forrester with 7,038 votes cast (40%), and all other candidates with 625 votes cast (3.5%), among the 17,588 ballots cast by the city's 39,878 registered voters (46%).

Education
The Clifton Public Schools serve students in pre-kindergarten through twelfth grade. As of the 2020–21 school year, the district, comprised of 18 schools, had an enrollment of 10,514 students and 870.5 classroom teachers (on an FTE basis), for a student–teacher ratio of 12.1:1. Schools in the district (with 2020–21 enrollment data from the National Center for Education Statistics) are 
Clifton Early Learner Academy (377 students; in grades PreK), 
School One (245; K-5), 
School Two (385; K-5), 
School Three (282; K-5), 
School Four (141; K-5), 
School Five (373; K-5), 
School Eight (169; PreK-5), 
School Nine (285; K-5), 
School Eleven (415; K-5), 
School Twelve (616; PreK-5), 
School Thirteen (447; K-5), 
School Fourteen (356; K-5), 
School Fifteen (310; PreK-5), 
School Sixteen (195; K-5), 
School Seventeen (476; PreK-5), 
Christopher Columbus Middle School (1,172; 6-8), 
Woodrow Wilson Middle School (1,276; 6-8) and 
Clifton High School  (2,891; 9-12).

With more than 3,300 students enrolled in 2006, Clifton High School was the largest single-facility high school in New Jersey; Elizabeth High School had more students, but they were spread over multiple campuses before the school was split into separate academies. An additional overflow site, the Clifton High School Annex, was constructed at a cost of $17 million and opened in September 2009 to accommodate 540 of the school year's 850 incoming Freshman to alleviate overcrowding.

Classical Academy Charter School of Clifton, a charter school founded in 1998 for Clifton residents that provides an education based on the classics to students in sixth through eighth grades, was recognized in 2008 by the National Blue Ribbon Schools Program.

Private schools in Clifton include Saint Philip Preparatory School, a K–8 elementary school that operates under the auspices of the Roman Catholic Diocese of Paterson. St. Andrew the Apostle School was closed after the 2017–2018 school year due to financial challenges and a decline in the number of students registering for the new school year. St. Brendan Catholic School, which opened in 1946, was closed after the 2018–2019 school year and merged with the Academy of St. James in Totowa, with the merged school to be called The Academy of St. James and St. Brendan.

Emergency services
The Clifton Police Department is a full-service department and employs 159 sworn officers, 20 public safety telecommunicators, 12 civilians and 25 part-time special officers. The department is led by Chief Mark Centurione, who was sworn into the position in May 2016.

The Clifton Fire Department currently has 143 career firefighters.  The department operates a fleet of five engines, two ladders and three basic life support ambulances 24/7, three marine rescue boats, a foam tender, a foam pumper, a light rescue truck, plus a haz-mat unit which are cross staffed. The department is led by Chief Frank S. Prezioso.

Hatzolah of Passaic/Clifton EMS is a volunteer service that primarily covers the Passaic Park neighborhood of Passaic and parts of Clifton. Hatzolah operates two ambulances strategically parked throughout the community with a third on standby and available to assist neighboring chapters such as Union City and Elizabeth.

Transportation

Roads and highways

Major roadways in the city include Route 3 (which crosses from east to west along the southern portion of the city), Route 21 (along the Passaic River), Route 19 in the city's northwest and U.S. Route 46. The Garden State Parkway crosses the city, connecting Bloomfield in Essex County to the south to Elmwood Park in Bergen County in the north. Parkway interchanges 153 (signed for Route 3 and Route 46 West) / 153A (for Route 3 East) / 153B (for Route 3 and Route 46 West), 154 (for Route 46), 155 (for Clifton) / 155P (for Passaic) and 156 (to Route 46).

Public transportation
NJ Transit trains at the Clifton station and Delawanna station follow the NJ Transit Main Line to Suffern and Hoboken Terminal. Until 1966, the Newark Branch of the Erie-Lackawanna Railroad served several stations in the town, Athenia (Colfax Avenue) and Allwood. The Newark Branch tracks are now used for freight only, operated by Norfolk Southern.

NJ Transit provides bus service on the 190, 191, 192 and 195 routes to the Port Authority Bus Terminal in Midtown Manhattan, to Newark on the 13, 27 and 72 routes, and local service on the 74, 702, 703, 705, 707, 709, 744 routes.

DeCamp Bus Lines provides service on the 33 and 66 routes to the Port Authority Bus Terminal in Midtown Manhattan.

In popular culture
 The character of Rupert Pupkin in Martin Scorsese's film The King of Comedy comes from Clifton.
 The movie Donnie Brasco, which starred Johnny Depp and Al Pacino, was filmed partially in Clifton in 1996.
 Many scenes from The Sopranos were filmed in the town, including the Main Memorial Park and Clifton High School. The golf scenes were filmed at the Upper Montclair Country Club.
 New York Yankee Hall of Famers Yogi Berra and Phil Rizzuto owned a bowling alley in Clifton called "Rizzuto-Berra Bowling Lanes."  The alley, later known as Astro Bowl, was located in the Styertowne Shopping Center in the Allwood section of town and remained open until 1999.
 The Upper Montclair Country Club was home to the NFL Golf Classic and the Thunderbird Classic. The Sybase Classic golf tournament was held there annually until 2009.
 Baseball Hall of Famer Honus Wagner played his last two seasons (1896–1897) of minor league baseball for the Paterson Silk Sox. While the team was named Paterson, the team played their games at Doherty Field, located off of Main Avenue behind the Doherty Silk Mill.
 Clifton has an old sewerage system, accessible to intrepid urban explorers and evidently not actively maintained by any municipal authority or utility, known to some as the "Gates Of Hell." The walls are full of graffiti. The Clifton "Gates of Hell" are featured in Weird New Jersey.

Notable people

People who were born in, residents of, or otherwise closely associated with Clifton include:
 Jay Alford (born 1983), defensive lineman and long snapper for the Super Bowl XLII champion New York Giants
 Nina Arianda (born ), film and theatrical actress
 Greg Bajek (born 1968), retired soccer player, coach and team owner who played professionally in the American Professional Soccer League and owned a franchise in the USL Premier Development League
 William J. Bate (1934–2011), politician who served as a state senator, assemblyman, and judge
 Sofia Black-D'Elia (born 1991), actress; played Tea Marvelli in Skins, Sage Spence in Gossip Girl and Andrea Cornish in The Night Of
 Jonathan Borrajo (born 1987), soccer wingback / defensive midfielder who played for the New York Red Bulls and the Norwegian team Mjøndalen IF 
 Todd Brewster, author, journalist, former Senior Editorial Producer for ABC News
 Russ Carroccio (1931–1994), football offensive lineman who played in the NFL for the New York Giants and the Philadelphia Eagles * 
 Rubin Carter (1937–2014), professional boxer, author, motivational speaker and activist; the subject of the Bob Dylan song "Hurricane"
 David Chase (born 1945), creator of The Sopranos
 Bartolo Colón (born 1973), pitcher for the New York Mets
 Dow H. Drukker (1872–1963), represented  1914–1919
 Lew Erber (1934–1990), American football coach who was Offensive Coordinator for the New England Patriots and won two Super Bowls with the Oakland Raiders
 Vera Farmiga (born 1973), actress and director
 John Feikens (1917–2011), United States district judge of the United States District Court for the Eastern District of Michigan
 Hector Fonseca (born 1980), DJ and music producer
 Dan Garrett, head football coach for Kean University Cougars football team
 Gary Geld (born 1935), composer known for his work creating musicals and popular songs with his lyricist partner Peter Udell.
 Richard Godwin (1922–2005), the first Under Secretary of Defense for Acquisition, Technology and Logistics
 Bob Holly (born 1960), former quarterback in the NFL for the Washington Redskins, Philadelphia Eagles and Atlanta Falcons
 Tommy James (born 1947), musician, singer / songwriter and record producer, best known as leader of the 1960s rock band Tommy James and the Shondells
 Father Mychal F. Judge (1933–2001), FDNY Chaplain; first official death of the September 11, 2001, terrorist attacks on the World Trade Center
 Karin Korb, retired wheelchair tennis player who twice competed at the Summer Paralympics
Stephen Kovacs (1972–2022), saber fencer and fencing coach, charged with sexual assault, died in prison
 Wojtek Krakowiak (born 1976), retired Polish-American soccer midfielder who was the head coach of the Montana State University Billings women's soccer team after playing professionally in Major League Soccer
 Garret Kramer, author and performance coach
 Stan Lembryk (born 1969), retired professional soccer player
 Sue Macy (born 1954), author, whose 2019 book, The Book Rescuer, won the Sydney Taylor Book Award from the Association of Jewish Libraries
 Ernest Mario (born 1938), pharmaceutical executive
 Ronald F. Maxwell (born 1949), movie director
 Kayla Meneghin (born 1994) ice hockey forward for the Buffalo Beauts of the National Women's Hockey League
 Matt Miazga (born 1995), defender for Chelsea F.C. in Premier League
 Adam Najem (born 1995), professional footballer who plays as a midfielder for FC Edmonton and the Afghanistan national team
 David Najem (born 1992), soccer player who plays as a midfielder for the New York Red Bulls II in the USL
 Chris Opperman (born 1978), modern composer; performed on Steve Vai's Grammy-nominated composition "Lotus Feet"; grew up in Clifton and attended CHS
 Jazlyn Oviedo (born 2002), footballer who plays as a midfielder for the Dominican Republic women's national team
 Morris Pashman (1912–1999), New Jersey Supreme Court Justice
 Angelo Paternoster (1919–2012), offensive tackle for the Washington Redskins; went on to practice dentistry in Clifton
 Nikki Phillips (born 1987), American-born Polish soccer defender and midfielder, who has played with FC Kansas City in the National Women's Soccer League and for the Poland national team
 Michael J. Pollard (1939–2019), character actor and comedian widely known for his role as C.W. Moss in the film Bonnie and Clyde (1967), for which he received an Academy Award for Best Supporting Actor nomination
Anthony Provenzano (1917–1988), International Brotherhood of Teamsters official and mobster who was allegedly associated with the disappearance of Jimmy Hoffa
 Pamela Radcliff (born 1956), historian and professor at the University of California at San Diego; an authority on the history of modern Spain
 Norman M. Robertson (born 1951), politician who served on the Passaic County Board of Chosen Freeholders and later in the New Jersey State Senate, 1997–2001
 Giuseppe Rossi (born 1987), Italian American soccer player
 Miriam Sandler, singer and dancer; prolific backup singer during the 1990s for Latin pop artists such as Jon Secada and Gloria Estefan
 Jon Seda (born 1970), actor best known for his roles in NBC's Homicide: Life on the Street and the movie Selena
 James P. Shenton (1925–2003), historian of nineteenth-and twentieth-century America and professor at Columbia University
 Steve Smith (born 1985), wide receiver for the New York Football Giants
 Jimmy Snuka (1943–2017), professional wrestler
 William Staub (1915–2012), inventor of the home treadmill
 Gloria Struck (born 1925), Motorcycle Hall of Fame inductee
 Walt Szot (1920–1981), football tackle who played five seasons in the National Football League with the Chicago Cardinals and Pittsburgh Steelers
 Dave Szott (born 1967), former NFL offensive lineman who played for the New York Jets
 Patricia Travers (1927–2010), classical violinist
 Paul L. Troast (1894–1972), building contractor, chairman of the New Jersey Turnpike Authority during its construction, and one-time failed gubernatorial candidate in 1953
 Joe Lynn Turner (born 1951), singer
 Lawrence Tynes (born 1978), former NFL kicker who played for the New York Giants
 Dave White (born 1979), Derringer Award-winning mystery author and educator
 Ivan Wilzig (born 1956), techno musician
 Gerald H. Zecker (born 1942), member of the New Jersey General Assembly; mayor of Clifton 1978–1982
 Rachel Zegler (born 2001), actress starring in Stephen Spielberg's film adaptation of West Side Story

References

External links

 City of Clifton website

 
1917 establishments in New Jersey
1923 Municipal Manager Law
Cities in Passaic County, New Jersey
Populated places established in 1917